Jarosławiec  is a village in the administrative district of Gmina Sitno, within Zamość County, Lublin Voivodeship, in eastern Poland.

In 2005 the village had a population of 1,466.

References

Villages in Zamość County